Vagabond Army Heliport , formerly Vagabond Army Airfield, is located at the Yakima Training Center (YTC) in the U.S. state of Washington. Currently, only rotary winged aircraft are authorized to land at this facility as the airfield has been closed to fixed-wing aircraft. The existing  runway currently serves as a hover lane for approaches and departures. All repair and maintenance on the base is to accommodate rotary winged aircraft. The heliport has 22 parking pads for use by various types of helicopters.

References

External links
 Vagabond Army Airfield (GlobalSecurity.org)

Airports in Washington (state)
United States Army airfields
Airfields of the United States Army Air Forces Technical Service Command
Airfields of the United States Army Air Forces in Washington (state)
Transportation buildings and structures in Yakima County, Washington
1945 establishments in Washington (state)